Ferry Aman Saragih (born June 12, 1988) is an Indonesian professional footballer who plays as a midfielder for Liga 2 club Putra Delta Sidoarjo.

Honours

Club
Arema
 Indonesia President's Cup: 2017
 Indonesian Inter Island Cup: 2014/15

References

External links 
 

1987 births
Association football midfielders
Living people
People of Batak descent
People from Kediri (city)
Indonesian footballers
Liga 1 (Indonesia) players
Persewangi Banyuwangi players
Mitra Kukar players
Deltras F.C. players
Arema F.C. players
Borneo F.C. players
Sportspeople from East Java